Zhenjiang or Chinkiang vinegar is a rice-based black vinegar widely used in Chinese cuisine. It takes its name from the city of Zhenjiang in Jiangsu province.

History
Chinese legend ascribes the invention of the vinegar to Heita, a son of Dukang, one of the culture heroes credited with inventing alcoholic beverages in China's prehistory. Supposedly, Heita forgot a vat of wine for 21 days and, remembering it at dusk, found it pleasantly sour. Historical records for the present vinegar can be traced back 1400 years. The primary producer of Zhenjiang vinegar at present—the Jiangsu Hengshun Vinegar Industry Company—was established in 1840.

Production
 
Production of Zhenjiang vinegar begins when a vinegar pei mixture (wheat bran, rice hull, alcohol obtained from saccharification of glutinous rice and vinegar seed from a prior batch) is poured into an urn until the urn is half-full. The mixture is kept warm for up to 3 days in summer and 6 days in winter. At that point, rice hull is added and mixed in once per day until the urn is full. Salt is added and the urn is stored for up to 3 months during which it undergoes an aging process. The vinegar is then leached and the soaking liquid from water-soaked, parched rice is added as a color and flavor enhancer.

See also 
 Chinese rice vinegars

References

Chinese condiments
Rice
Vinegar
Zhenjiang